is a Japanese manga series written by Naoki Yamakawa and illustrated by Akinari Nao. It has been serialized in Kodansha's shōnen manga magazine Bessatsu Shōnen Magazine since June 2016. The manga is licensed in North America by Kodansha USA. An anime television series adaptation by Maho Film aired from October to December 2020, and a second season aired from July to September 2021.

Plot
Yuusuke Yotsuya, Iu Shindo, and Kusue Hakozaki were transported by a mysterious half-faced creature to do his play, asking them quests to complete the  game within the duration. As bonus, they are almost set as immortals, respawning after they die, if at least one of them survives until the time limit expires.

The trio were joined by 3 people, Yuka Yukitate, Keita Torii and Glenda Carter. They are doing missions and after passing it, they return to real life, but after the next quest appears, they return to the world, with few years passed since.

The mysterious creature, answers any questions they ask after every quest finished. And revealed that they were playing in countless alternate worlds and alternating sequences.

Characters

An unknown history has caused Yuusuke to be anti-social and selfish. Once in the world of quests, he excuses his actions for a pragmatic and selfish desire to survive. He hates humans, human society, and himself; however, he willingly deludes himself that his decision of who is of value will help better his chance of survival. He has emotions, but he would rather be a psychopath than to follow social norms. He is forced to do good as it is the optimal path to survival due to the way the Game Masters set the challenges to be death or find the right choice.

One of the few people summoned by the GM. From a troubled background, being bullied and from a biker gang, she plays the game and tries to improve herself. 

Another summoned by the GM. She was sickly and lacked stamina in her life, so she dreams to be a doctor to find a cure to her situation. She plays the game to improve herself.

Another summon by the GM. She was initially saved by Yuusuke from a bunch of her tormentors, but his way of helping her did earn her distrust. She loved magical girl anime series, inspired her to be a mage. 

She was a Knight from Cortanel and an NPC. She joined the group in their quest to deliver cargo. She fell in love with Yuusuke, and sad to see him go after finishing the quest. 15 years later, she had 2 children, lost her sword arm during a campaign against the enemy Deokk Empire, and settled on the city. She had a closure with Yuusuke, accepting the fact that she grew older than him. By the time of the 5th round, she dies of old age.

Keita was one of the assaulters trying to kill a former drug dealer. Yuusuke prevented the murder, he escaped before the police arrived. With their family's debt settled, he was thankful to Yuusuke. He became a gamer after being summoned by the GM, joining Yuusuke's group. 

One of the island's NPCs. She and Ahyu are the island village's two ceremonial/ritual dance performers.

One of the island's NPCs. She and Yana are the island village's two ceremonial/ritual dance performers. She fell in love with Yuusuke and later on confessed to him, wanting to retire and marry him.

Mercenary leader. He survived the event. Became a sorcerer by the 6th round. Took Malita to his master. Died by the 7th Round. 

An island native, left the island to be a mercenary warrior. Fought against the Orcs and died after defending the ship where the villagers are from both the Queen and the lava. 

A foreigner who records her adventures with a camera. Became another player summoned by the GM.
Habaki Futashige

A salaryman trying to commit suicide. Became a player after the company went bankrupt and the employee's salaries were taken by the company owners.
Malita

An NPC member of Militia/Vigilate group who fights a shadow war with GuerreroJaguars and Revolucionarios. Lost her family, her best friend Ilana in a botched raid, and hated the fact her former enemies and her friends became allies. Turned into a berserker by the 7th round.

Media

Manga
I'm Standing on a Million Lives is written by Naoki Yamakawa and illustrated by Akinari Nao. The series began in Kodansha's Bessatsu Shōnen Magazine on June 9, 2016. Kodansha has collected its chapters into individual tankōbon volumes. The first volume was released on October 7, 2016. As of March 9, 2022, sixteen volumes have been released.

In North America, the series is licensed for English release by Kodansha USA, who releases both in digital (since July 3, 2018) and print (May 28, 2019) formats.

Volume list

Anime
An anime television series adaptation was announced on March 3, 2020. It was produced by Maho Film and directed by Kumiko Habara, with Takao Yoshioka writing the scripts, Eri Kojima and Toshihide Masudate designing the characters, and Ken Ito composing the music. The series aired from October 2 to December 18, 2020, on Tokyo MX and other channels. Kanako Takatsuki performed the opening theme song "Anti world", while Liyuu performed the ending theme song "Carpe Diem." The series ran for 12 episodes. The anime is licensed by Crunchyroll for streaming outside of Asia. In Southeast Asia and South Asia, Medialink licensed the anime and streamed it on its Ani-One YouTube channel and iQIYI.

On December 18, 2020, shortly after the first season's finale aired, a second season was announced and aired from July 10 to September 25, 2021. VTuber Kaede Higuchi performed the second season's opening theme song "Baddest", while Kanako Takatsuki performed the second season's ending theme song "Subversive".

On May 18, 2020, it was announced Sentai Filmworks picked up the home video rights.

Episode list

Season 1

Season 2

Novel
A novel adaptation written by Sawako Kobayashi and illustrated by Nao was published by Kodansha on July 9, 2021.

See also
My Home Hero — Another manga series written by Naoki Yamakawa.

Notes

References

External links
  
  at Kodansha Comics
  
 

Anime series based on manga
Crunchyroll anime
Dark fantasy anime and manga
Isekai anime and manga
Isekai novels and light novels
Kodansha manga
Maho Film
Medialink
Sentai Filmworks
Shōnen manga